Marvin Coleman (born January 31, 1972) was a football player in the Canadian Football League for ten years. Coleman played cornerback for the Calgary Stampeders and the Winnipeg Blue Bombers from 1994-2003. He was a CFL All-Star three times.

References

External links
Just Sports Stats

1972 births
Living people
Calgary Stampeders players
Canadian football defensive backs
Canadian football return specialists
Central State Marauders football players
Sportspeople from Ocala, Florida
Winnipeg Blue Bombers players
San Francisco Demons players